On 1 May 1960, a United States U-2 spy plane was shot down by the Soviet Air Defence Forces while conducting photographic aerial reconnaissance deep inside Soviet territory. The single-seat aircraft, flown by American pilot Francis Gary Powers, had taken off from Peshawar, Pakistan, and crashed near Sverdlovsk (present-day Yekaterinburg), after being hit by an S-75 Dvina (SA-2 Guideline) surface-to-air missile. Powers parachuted to the ground safely and was captured.

Initially, American authorities acknowledged the incident as the loss of a civilian weather research aircraft operated by NASA, but were forced to admit the mission's true purpose a few days later after the Soviet government produced the captured pilot and parts of the U-2's surveillance equipment, including photographs of Soviet military bases.

The incident occurred during the tenures of American president Dwight D. Eisenhower and Soviet leader Nikita Khrushchev, around two weeks before the scheduled opening of an east–west summit in Paris, France. Krushchev and Eisenhower had met face-to-face at Camp David in Maryland in September 1959, and the seeming thaw in U.S.-Soviet relations had raised hopes globally for a peaceful resolution to the Cold War. The U2 incident shattered the amiable "Spirit of Camp David" that had prevailed for eight months, prompting the cancellation of the summit in Paris and causing great embarrassment to the U.S. on the international stage. The Pakistani government issued a formal apology to the Soviet Union for its role in the U-2 mission.

Following his capture, Powers was convicted of espionage and sentenced to three years of imprisonment plus seven years of hard labour; he was released two years later, in February 1962, in a prisoner exchange for Soviet intelligence officer Rudolf Abel.

Background

In July 1958, U.S. President Dwight D. Eisenhower requested permission from the Pakistani prime minister Feroze Khan Noon for the U.S. to establish a secret intelligence facility in Pakistan and for the U-2 spyplane to fly from Pakistan. The U-2 flew at altitudes that could not be reached by Soviet fighter jets of the era; it was believed to be beyond the reach of Soviet missiles as well. A facility established in Badaber (Peshawar Air Station),  from Peshawar, was a cover for a major communications intercept operation run by the United States National Security Agency (NSA). Badaber was an excellent location because of its proximity to Soviet central Asia. This enabled the monitoring of missile test sites, key infrastructure and communications. The U-2 "spy-in-the-sky" was allowed to use the Pakistan Air Force section of Peshawar Airport to gain vital photo intelligence in an era before satellite observation.

President Eisenhower did not want to fly American U-2 pilots over the Soviet Union because he felt that if one of these pilots were to be shot down or captured, it could be seen as an act of aggression. At a time like the Cold War, any act of aggression could spark open conflict between the two countries. In order to ease the burden of flying Americans into Soviet airspace the idea developed to have British pilots from the Royal Air Force fly these missions in place of the American Central Intelligence Agency (CIA). With the United Kingdom still reeling from the aftermath of the Suez Crisis and in no position to snub American requests, the British government was amenable to the proposal. Using British pilots allowed Eisenhower to be able to use the U-2 aircraft to spy for American interests in the Soviet Union, while still being able to plausibly deny any affiliation if a mission became compromised.

After the success of the first two British pilots and because of pressure to determine the number of Soviet intercontinental ballistic missiles more accurately, Eisenhower allowed the flying of two more missions before the Four Power Paris Summit, scheduled for 16 May. The final two missions before the summit were to be flown by American pilots.

On 9 April 1960, a U-2C spyplane of the special CIA unit "10-10", piloted by Bob Ericson, crossed the southern national boundary of the Soviet Union in the area of Pamir Mountains and flew over four Soviet top secret military objects: the Semipalatinsk Test Site, the Dolon Air Base where Tu-95 strategic bombers were stationed, the surface-to-air missile (SAM) test site of the Soviet Air Defence Forces near Saryshagan, and the Tyuratam missile range (Baikonur Cosmodrome).

The U-2 left Soviet air space and landed at an Iranian airstrip at Zahedan. It was clear that the U.S. Central Intelligence Agency had successfully performed an extraordinarily dangerous but productive intelligence operation. The next flight of the U-2 spyplane from Peshawar airport was planned for late April.

Event 

On 28 April 1960, a U.S. Lockheed U-2C spy plane, Article 358, was ferried from Incirlik Air Base in Turkey to the US base at Peshawar airport by pilot Glen Dunaway. Fuel for the aircraft had been ferried to Peshawar the previous day in a US Air Force C-124 transport. A US Air Force C-130 followed, carrying the ground crew, mission pilot Francis Powers, and the backup pilot, Bob Ericson. On the morning of 29 April, the crew in Badaber was informed that the mission had been delayed one day. As a result, Bob Ericson flew Article 358 back to Incirlik and John Shinn ferried another U-2C, Article 360, from Incirlik to Peshawar. On 30 April, the mission was delayed one day further because of bad weather over the Soviet Union.

The weather improved and on 1 May, 15 days before the scheduled opening of the east–west summit conference in Paris, Captain Powers, flying Article 360, 56–6693 left the base in Peshawar on a mission with the operations code word GRAND SLAM to overfly the Soviet Union, photographing targets including the ICBM sites at the Baikonur Cosmodrome and Plesetsk Cosmodrome, then land at Bodø in Norway. At the time, the USSR had six ICBM launch pads, two at Baikonur and four at Plesetsk. Mayak, then named Chelyabinsk-65, an important industrial center of plutonium processing, was another of the targets that Powers was to photograph. A close study of Powers's account of the flight shows that one of the last targets he overflew, before being shot down, was the Chelyabinsk-65 plutonium production facility.

The U-2 flight was expected, and all units of the Soviet Air Defence Forces in the Central Asia, Kazakhstan, Siberia, Ural, and later in the USSR European Region and Extreme North, were placed on red alert. Soon after the aircraft was detected, Lieutenant General of the Air Force Yevgeniy Savitskiy ordered the air-unit commanders "to attack the violator by all alert flights located in the area of foreign plane's course, and to ram if necessary".

Because of the U-2's extreme operating altitude, Soviet attempts to intercept the aircraft using fighter aircraft failed. The U-2's course was out of range of several of the nearest SAM sites, and one SAM site even failed to engage the aircraft since it was not on duty that day. The U-2 was shot down near Kosulino, Ural Region, by the first of three S-75 Dvina surface-to-air missiles fired by a battery commanded by Mikhail Voronov. The SA-75 site had been supposedly identified previously by the CIA, using photos taken during Vice President Richard Nixon's visit to Sverdlovsk the previous summer.

Powers bailed out but neglected to disconnect his oxygen hose first and struggled with it until it broke, enabling him to separate from the aircraft. After parachuting safely down onto Soviet soil, Powers was quickly captured. Powers carried with him a modified silver dollar which contained a lethal, shellfish-derived saxitoxin-tipped needle, but he did not use it.

The SAM command center was unaware that the aircraft was destroyed for more than 30 minutes. One of the Soviet MiG-19 fighters pursuing Powers was also destroyed in the missile salvo, and the pilot, Sergei Safronov, was killed. The MiGs' IFF transponders were not yet switched to the new May codes because of the 1 May holiday.

American cover-up and exposure 

Four days after Powers's disappearance, NASA issued a very detailed press release noting that an aircraft had "gone missing" north of Turkey. The press release speculated that the pilot might have fallen unconscious while the autopilot was still engaged, even falsely claiming that "the pilot reported over the emergency frequency that he was experiencing oxygen difficulties". To bolster this, a U-2 was quickly painted in NASA colors and shown to the media. Under the impression that the pilot had died and that the plane had been destroyed, the Americans had decided to use the NASA cover-up plan. Nikita Khrushchev used the American misstep to embarrass President Eisenhower and his administration.

That same day on 5 May, the Senate made its first comments on the U-2 incident and began a domestic political controversy for Eisenhower. Mike Mansfield, the Senate Majority Whip, stated, "First reports indicate that the President had no knowledge of the plane incident. If that is the case, we have got to ask whether or not this administration has any real control over the federal bureaucracy." Mansfield, more than any other person, highlighted the dilemma Eisenhower faced—Eisenhower could admit responsibility for the U-2 flight, and likely ruin any chances for détente at the Paris Summit, or he could continue to deny knowledge and indicate that he did not control his own administration.

After Khrushchev found out about America's NASA cover story, he developed a political trap for Eisenhower. His plan began with the release of information to the world that a spy plane had been shot down in Soviet territory, but he did not reveal that the pilot of this aircraft had also been found and that he was alive. With the information that Khrushchev released, the Americans believed that they would be able to continue with their cover story that the crashed U-2 was a weather research aircraft and not a military spy plane. The cover-up stated that the pilot of the U-2 weather aircraft had radioed in that he was experiencing oxygen difficulties while flying over Turkey. From there they claimed that the aircraft could have continued on its path because of auto-pilot, and that this could be the U-2 that crashed in the Soviet Union. The final attempt to make the cover story seem as real as possible was the grounding of all U-2 aircraft for mandatory inspection of oxygen systems in order to make sure that no other "weather missions" would have the same result as the one that was lost and possibly crashed in the Soviet Union.

On 7 May, Khrushchev sprang his trap and announced: 

Also, because of the release of some photographs of the aircraft, there was evidence that most of the covert U-2 technologies had survived the crash. From this Khrushchev was able to openly embarrass the Eisenhower administration by exposing the attempted cover-up.

Khrushchev still attempted to allow Eisenhower to save face, and possibly to salvage the peace summit to some degree, by specifically laying the blame not on Eisenhower himself, but on Director of Central Intelligence Allen Dulles and the CIA: Khrushchev said that anyone wishing to understand the U-2's mission should "seek a reply from Allen Dulles, at whose instructions the American aircraft flew over the Soviet Union". On 9 May, the Soviet premier told US ambassador Thompson that he "could not help but suspect that someone had launched this operation with the deliberate intent of spoiling the summit meeting". Thompson also wrote in his diplomatic cable that Khrushchev suspected it was Allen Dulles, and that Khrushchev had heard about Senator Mansfield's remarks that Eisenhower did not control his own administration.

Upon receiving this cable, Eisenhower, who frequently was very animated, was quiet and depressed. The only words he said to his secretary were, "I would like to resign." Meanwhile, the domestic pressure continued to mount. Eisenhower then accepted Dulles's argument that the congressional leadership needed to be briefed on the U-2 missions from the last four years. Dulles told the legislature that all U-2 flights were used for aerial espionage and had been flown pursuant to "presidential directives". Still, Dulles played down Eisenhower's direct role in approving every previous U-2 flight.

The next day on 10 May, without consulting with any agency heads, House Appropriations Chair Clarence Cannon received considerable press attention when he, not President Eisenhower, revealed the true nature of the U-2 mission. He said to an open session of the House of Representatives that the U-2 was a CIA aircraft engaged in aerial espionage over the Soviet Union. Cannon said,

At the end of Cannon's speech, Democrats and Republicans uncharacteristically rose to their feet to applaud.

Still, Eisenhower faced criticism in the press for not controlling his own administration, as Cannon's speech only said the mission was "under the aegis of" the president, not "directed by". Press reports were creating a belief in the public that Eisenhower had lost control, which Eisenhower would not let stand. Knowing that he was jeopardizing the Paris Peace Summit, Eisenhower decided to reveal the aerial espionage program and his direct role in it, an unprecedented move for a U.S. president. His speech on 11 May revolved around four main points: the need for intelligence gathering activities; the nature of intelligence gathering activities; how intelligence activities should be viewed (as distasteful, but vital); and finally that Americans should not be distracted from the real problems of the day. Eisenhower closed passionately by reacting to the Soviet claim that the US acted provocatively and said: "They had better look at their own [espionage] record." As he finished, he told reporters he was still going to the Paris Peace Summit.

From the Congressional Research Service report "Covert Action: An Effective Instrument of U.S. Foreign Policy?", dated 21 October 1996, released by Wikileaks: "Many observers believed that when President Eisenhower in 1960 accepted responsibility for U-2 overflights of the Soviet Union, he made reaching agreements with Moscow much more difficult; had he blamed the flights on the Pentagon or the CIA, Khrushchev arguably might not have felt forced to react so strongly even though he might not believe the denials. Such reasoning, while constrained, is hardly unusual. It is easier for a President to deal with foreign leaders who are known to have committed violent acts, but have never admitted having done so, than to meet formally with those who have acknowledged 'unacceptable' behavior."

Today a large part of the wreck as well as many items from Powers's survival pack are on display at the Central Armed Forces Museum in Moscow. A small piece of the U-2 was returned to the United States and is on display at the National Cryptologic Museum.

Intelligence 

Already from 1948, Norwegian Selmer Nilsen had been recruited by the Soviet intelligence organization GRU, amongst other foreigners, to spy on allied activity in NATO countries. Nilsen was assigned to watch allied military activity in northern Norway. The U-2 operations were linked with the airport Bodø, which was one of its permanent stations. Selmer Nilsen recorded U-2 activity in Bodø and forwarded much military information to the Soviet Union. He was convicted for espionage in 1968 in a closed trial in Norway, with a penalty of seven years and six months' imprisonment. He was released after three years.

Aftermath

Contemporary reactions and effect on the Four Powers Summit  
The Summit was attended by Eisenhower, Khrushchev, French President Charles de Gaulle, and British Prime Minister Harold Macmillan. It was the first conference to be attended by both Soviet and western leaders in five years. However, prospects for constructive dialogue were dashed by the explosive controversy surrounding the U-2 flight over Soviet territory.

Although the Four Powers Summit was the first meeting between western and Soviet leaders in five years when it was held, the mood was optimistic that there could be an easing of tensions between the Soviet Union and the United States. In an effort to present a less hostile, more cordial Soviet Union, Khrushchev publicly advocated a policy of "peaceful coexistence with the United States". The May Day celebrations on 1 May of that year were marked by this newfound cooperative spirit. Absent were the militarized symbols of previous parades, such as artillery and armor. Instead, there were children, white doves, and athletes. But the reaction of the Soviet government to the spy plane incident and the response from the United States doomed any potential meaningful peace agreement.

In the days directly leading up to the conference, tensions increased dramatically between the United States and the Soviet Union over the U-2 incident. At this point in the negotiations, the hardliners of the Soviet government were applying heavy pressure to Khrushchev. In the weeks leading up to the summit there had been a revitalization of anti-American sentiment within the Kremlin, with the Soviets blocking a planned trip to Washington D.C. of a Soviet air marshal, inviting Chinese communist leader Mao Zedong to Moscow, and launching an anti-American press campaign designed to critique "American aggression". At this time east and west were divided about how to move forward in Berlin, and the American press characterized Khrushchev's decision to emphasize the U-2 incident at the summit as an attempt to gain leverage on this issue.

The summit itself did not last long, with talks only beginning on 15 May and ending on 16 May. Both Eisenhower and Khrushchev gave statements on the 16th. Khrushchev blasted the United States on the U-2 incident. He pointed out that the policy of secret spying was one of mistrust and that the incident had doomed the summit before it even began. He expected the United States and Eisenhower to condemn the spying and pledge to end further reconnaissance missions.

At the summit, after Khrushchev had blown Eisenhower's cover, Eisenhower did not deny that the aircraft had been spying on Soviet military installations but contended that the action was not aggressive but defensive. He argued that the current state of international relations was not one in which peaceful coexistence was an already established fact. The policy of the United States towards the Soviet Union at that time was defensive and cautionary. Eisenhower also made the point that dialogue at the Four Powers Summit was the type of international negotiation that could lead to a relationship between the United States and the Soviet Union where there would be no need to spy on each other. Eisenhower also laid out a plan for an international agreement that authorized the U.N. to "inspect" any nations willing to submit to its authority for signs of increased militarization and aggressive action. He stated that the United States would be more than willing to submit to such an inspection by the U.N. and that he hoped to circumvent the spying controversy with this alternative international surveillance agreement.

The meeting during which both parties made their statements lasted just over three hours. During this time Khrushchev rescinded an invitation he had earlier given to Eisenhower to visit the Soviet Union.

According to American broadcast journalist Walter Cronkite, Khrushchev would go on to say that this incident was the beginning of his decline in power as party chairman, perhaps because he seemed unable to negotiate the international arena and the communist hardliners at home. The collapse of the summit also saw an increased tension between the Soviets and the Americans in the years to come. After this debacle, the arms race accelerated and any considerations for negotiations were dashed for the immediate future.

Consequences of the incident
As a result of the spy plane incident and the attempted cover-up, the Four Power Paris Summit was not completed. At the beginning of the talks on 16 May, there was still hope that the two sides could come together even after the events that took place earlier in May, but Eisenhower refused to apologize and Khrushchev left the summit one day after it had begun. Even though Eisenhower refused to apologize, he did admit that the flights were "suspended and would not resume". Some public opinion was that Khrushchev had overreacted to the event in an attempt to strengthen his own position, and for that, he was the one to blame for the collapse of the Four Power Paris Summit.

Before the U-2 incident Khrushchev and Eisenhower had been getting along well and the summit was going to be an opportunity for the two sides to come together. Also, Eisenhower had been looking forward to a visit to the Soviet Union and was very upset when his invitation was retracted. The two sides were going to discuss topics such as nuclear arms reduction and also how to deal with increasing tensions surrounding Berlin. According to Eisenhower, had it not been for the U-2 incident, the summit and his visit to the Soviet Union could have greatly helped Soviet and American relations.

The Soviet Union convened a meeting of the United Nations Security Council on 23 May to tell their side of the story. The meetings continued for four days with other allegations of spying being exchanged, as well as recriminations over the Paris Summit, and a US offer of an "open skies" proposal to allow reciprocal flights over one another's territory, at the end of which the Soviet Union overwhelmingly lost a vote on a concise resolution which would have condemned the incursions and requested the US to prevent their recurrence.

The incident also reverberated around the world. For example in Japan, the incident contributed to the growth of the ongoing Anpo protests against the U.S.-Japan Security Treaty (known as "Anpo" in Japanese) which allowed the United States to maintain military bases on Japanese soil. The Japanese government was forced to admit that U-2 planes were also based at U.S. bases in Japan, which meant that Japan might be subject to attack should a war break out between the United States and the Soviet Union. Accordingly, when the U2 revelations came to light, Japanese protesters felt added urgency in their drive to eliminate the treaty and rid Japan of U.S. military bases.

Fallout in Pakistan and Norway
The U-2 incident severely compromised Pakistan's security and dented relations with the United States. After the incident, Nikita Khrushchev threatened to drop a nuclear bomb on Peshawar, thus warning Pakistan that it had become a target of Soviet nuclear forces. General Khalid Mahmud Arif of the Pakistan Army stated that "Pakistan felt deceived because the US had kept her in the dark about such clandestine spy operations launched from Pakistan's territory", although Pakistan's president Ayub Khan may have known about the operations. Ayub Khan visited the USSR in 1965 and apologized for the incident. When Ayub Khan invited Soviet foreign minister Andrei Gromyko to visit Pakistan, pointing out he'd never visited the country, the latter sarcastically replied "I always keep ahead of the U-2".

The communications wing at Badaber was formally closed down on 7 January 1970. Further, the Senate Foreign Relations Committee held a lengthy inquiry into the U-2 incident.

Norway
In Norway, authorities gave permission for the United States to have a temporary base in Bodø during 1960; the condition was that U2 missions were only to fly over international waters; the request from the U.S. was made to chief of intelligence Karl Evang, then passed on to defense minister Nils Handal, then passed on to "regjeringens sikkerhetsutvalg ('the Cabinet's security committee') where prime minister Gerhardsen and foreign minister Lange" were members.

In the Norwegian Armed Forces, the U2 incident caused "dirty laundry to be aired", but no blame was assigned; as of 2022, the archives [from 1960] of Norwegian Intelligence Service has not been declassified.

Sergei Khrushchev's anger at Norway's aiding the U.S. surveillance on Soviet, resulted in Krushchev threatening to drop nuclear bombs on Bodø.

Pilot's fate
Upon his capture, Gary Powers told his Soviet captors what his mission had been and why he had been in Soviet airspace. He did this in accordance with orders that he had received before he went on his mission. Powers pleaded guilty and was convicted of espionage on 19 August and sentenced to three years imprisonment and seven years of hard labor. He served one year and nine months of the sentence before being exchanged for Rudolf Abel on 10 February 1962. The exchange occurred on the Glienicke Bridge connecting Potsdam, East Germany, to West Berlin.

New tactics and technology
The incident showed that even high-altitude aircraft were vulnerable to Soviet surface-to-air missiles. As a result, the United States began emphasizing high-speed, low-level flights for its previously high altitude B-47, B-52 and B-58 bombers, and began developing the supersonic F-111, which would include an FB-111A variant for the Strategic Air Command. The Corona spy satellite project was accelerated. The CIA also accelerated the development of the Lockheed A-12 OXCART supersonic spyplane that first flew in 1962 and later began developing the Lockheed D-21 unmanned drone.

As a result of the capture, the Russians reverse-engineered the U-2 and ended up producing the Beriev S-13, but development was cancelled after Powers was released.

Later versions
The original consensus about the cause of the U-2 incident was that the spy plane had been shot down by one of a salvo of 14 Soviet SA-2 missiles. This story was originated by Oleg Penkovsky, a GRU agent who spied for MI6. In 2010, CIA documents were released indicating that "top US officials never believed Powers's account of his fateful flight because it appeared to be directly contradicted by a report from the National Security Agency" which alleged that the U-2 had descended from 65,000 to 34,000 feet (19,812 to 10,363 m) before changing course and disappearing from radar. One contemporary reading of the NSA's story is that they mistakenly tracked the descent of a MiG-19 piloted by Sr. Lt. Sergei Safronov.

Igor Mentyukov
In 1996, Soviet pilot Captain Igor Mentyukov claimed that, at  altitude, under orders to ram the intruder, he had caught the U-2 in the slipstream of his unarmed Sukhoi Su-9, causing the U-2 to flip over and break its wings. The salvo of missiles had indeed scored a hit, downing a pursuing MiG-19, not the U-2. Mentyukov said that if a missile had hit the U-2, its pilot would not have lived.

With no weapons, the only attack option open to him was aerial ramming. Mentyukov asserted that Soviet generals concealed these facts to avoid challenging Nikita Khrushchev's faith in the efficiency of Soviet air defenses.

Sergei Khrushchev
In 2000, Sergei Khrushchev wrote about the experience of his father, Nikita Khrushchev, in the incident. He described how Mentyukov attempted to intercept the U-2, but failed to gain visual contact. Major Mikhail Voronov, in control of a battery of anti-aircraft missiles, fired three SA-2s at the radar contact but only one ignited. It quickly rose toward the target and exploded in the air behind the U-2 but near enough to violently shake the aircraft, tearing off its long wings. At a lower altitude, Powers climbed out of the falling fuselage and parachuted to the ground. Uncertainty about the initial shootdown success resulted in 13 further anti-aircraft missiles being fired by neighboring batteries, but the later missiles only hit a pursuing MiG-19 piloted by Sr. Lt. Sergei Safronov, mortally wounding him. This account of the events that occurred during the mission matches the details that were given to the CIA by Gary Powers. According to Powers, a missile exploded behind him and after this occurred his U-2 began to nosedive. It is at this point that Powers began to make all of the preparations to eject. Powers landed safely and tried to hide in the Soviet countryside until he could get help. His attempts to do this failed and he was captured. Sergei Safronov was posthumously awarded the Order of the Red Banner.

Selmer Nilsen
In 1981, Selmer Nilsen, a Norwegian convicted for spying for the Soviet Union, claimed in his book 'I Was a Russian Spy' that Powers's U-2 had actually been sabotaged. He alleged that a bomb had been placed in the tail of the aircraft by two Soviet spies disguised as mechanics at a Turkish airfield. He claimed to have been told this by Soviet officials shortly after the incident. This may have been a contemporary 1962 theory also. Ian Fleming, writing his 1963 James Bond novel, On Her Majesty's Secret Service, had M mention to Bond during a briefing that "a plastic explosives expert was working for the KGB in Turkey. If it's true that the U-2 that fellow Powers was piloting was brought down by delayed charges and not by rockets, it may be this man is implicated."

Film
In 2015, the Steven Spielberg feature film Bridge of Spies was released, which dramatized James B. Donovan (Tom Hanks)'s negotiations for Powers's release, but took certain liberties with what really happened. For instance, Powers is shown being tortured by the Soviets, when in reality he was treated well by his captors and spent much of his time doing handicrafts.

In January 2016, the BBC magazine produced photographs from the time and an interview with Powers's son.

See also

United States aerial reconnaissance of the Soviet Union
Second-term curse

General:
Cold War (1953–1962)
Operation Sandblast

Analogous incidents:
1960 RB-47 shootdown incident
Cuban Missile Crisis
Hainan Island incident
Iran–U.S. RQ-170 incident
Korean Air Lines Flight 007
Korean Air Lines Flight 902
Rudolf Anderson
2023 Chinese balloon incident

References

Further reading
Geelhoed, E. Bruce. Diplomacy Shot Down: The U-2 Crisis and Eisenhower’s Aborted Mission to Moscow, 1959–1960. Norman: University of Oklahoma Press, 2020.
Khrushchev, Sergei N. Nikita Khrushchev and the Creation of a Superpower. State College, PA: Penn State Press, 2000. .
Miller, Jay. Lockheed U-2; Aerograph 3. Aerofax, Inc., 1983. .
Pickett, William B. "Eisenhower, Khrushchev, and the U-2 Affair: A Forty-six Year Retrospective." In: Clifford, J. Garry, and Theodore A. Wilson (eds). Presidents, Diplomats, and Other Mortals: Essays Honoring Robert H. Ferrell. Columbia, Missouri: University of Missouri Press, 2007, pp. 137–153. .
Pocock, Chris. Dragon Lady: The History of the U-2 Spyplane. Osceola, WI: Motorbooks International, 1989. .
Pocock, Chris. 50 Years of the U-2: The Complete Illustrated History of the "Dragon Lady". Atglen, PA: Schiffer Military History, 2005. .
Taubman, Phil. Secret Empire: Eisenhower, the CIA, and the Hidden Story of America's Space Espionage. New York: Simon & Schuster, 2003. .
Thompson, William J. Khrushchev (1995) pp 220–230.
Watry, David M. Diplomacy at the Brink: Eisenhower, Churchill, and Eden in the Cold War. Baton Rouge: Louisiana State University Press, 2014.
West, Nigel. Seven Spies Who Changed the World. London: Secker & Warburg, 1991. .

External links
U-2 Spy Plane Incident (online documents). Dwight D. Eisenhower Presidential Library.
The U-2 airplane incident , according to the U.S. Department of State, Office of the Historian
1962 Russia frees US spy plane pilot
The U-2 Spy Plane Incident – slideshow by Life magazine
Eisenhower's speech addressing the U-2 incident
"The CIA and the U-2 Program" (1998).  Central Intelligence Agency.
Central Museum of the Armed Forces in Moscow

1960 in international relations
1960 in military history
1960 in politics
U-2 incident
May 1960 events in Europe
20th-century aircraft shootdown incidents
Aviation accidents and incidents in the Soviet Union
Aviation accidents and incidents in 1960
Cold War conflicts
Cold War history of Norway
Combat incidents
Diplomatic incidents
Espionage scandals and incidents
Violations of Soviet airspace
Espionage in the Soviet Union
Aerial reconnaissance
Pakistan–Soviet Union relations
Pakistan–United States relations
Soviet Union–United States relations
Presidency of Dwight D. Eisenhower

fi:U-2#U-2 ammutaan alas